Daniele Tirabassi (born August 16, 1988) is a Venezuelan swimmer, who specialized in long-distance freestyle events. He represented his nation Venezuela at the 2008 Summer Olympics, and has also won a career total of five medals (two golds, one silver, and two bronze) in a major international competition, spanning two editions of the South American Games and the 2010 Central American and Caribbean Games. Tirabassi also holds multiple Venezuelan championship titles and national records in both the long-distance freestyle (200 and 400 m), and freestyle relay events.

Tirabassi competed for Venezuela in the men's 400 m freestyle at the 2008 Summer Olympics in Beijing. He fired off a powerful 3:52.69 to win handily over the rest of the competition and dip beneath the FINA B-standard (3:58.00) at the Latin Cup in Serravalle, San Marino. Leading the first heat from the initial length until the 250-metre lap, Tirabassi tried to hold on with Norway's Gard Kvale towards the final turn of the race by just half a body length apart from each other, but could not catch him immediately to regain his lead and end up instead with a runner-up time in 3:53.26. Tirabassi failed to advance further to the top eight final, as he placed thirty-first overall in the prelims.

At the 2009 FINA World Championships in Rome, Italy, Tirabassi set a Venezuelan record of 1:48.51 to touch the wall first on the tenth heat of the 200 m freestyle. At the 2011 Pan American Games in Guadalajara, Mexico, Tirabassi posted a time of 1:52.31 to round out the field in last place on the same distance, but missed his record by nearly four seconds.

Tirabassi is also a member of the Pine Crest Swim Team in Miami, Florida, where he trained with numerous world-class swimmers including three-time Olympian Bradley Ally of Barbados, and Genaro Prono, an Auburn University graduate and a breaststroke specialist from Paraguay.

References

External links
NBC Olympics Profile

1988 births
Living people
Venezuelan male freestyle swimmers
Olympic swimmers of Venezuela
Swimmers at the 2008 Summer Olympics
Swimmers at the 2011 Pan American Games
Swimmers at the 2015 Pan American Games
Sportspeople from Caracas
Pan American Games medalists in swimming
Pan American Games bronze medalists for Venezuela
Central American and Caribbean Games silver medalists for Venezuela
Central American and Caribbean Games bronze medalists for Venezuela
Competitors at the 2010 Central American and Caribbean Games
South American Games gold medalists for Venezuela
South American Games bronze medalists for Venezuela
South American Games medalists in swimming
Competitors at the 2010 South American Games
Competitors at the 2014 South American Games
Central American and Caribbean Games medalists in swimming
Medalists at the 2011 Pan American Games
20th-century Venezuelan people
21st-century Venezuelan people